The following is a list of notable events and releases of the year 1883 in Norwegian music.

Events

Deaths

 March
 2 – Friedrich August Reissiger, composer (born 1809)

 June
 6 – Per Lasson, composer (born 1859)

Births

 August
 17 – Alfred Evensen, composer (died 1942).

See also
 1883 in Norway
 Music of Norway

References

 
Norwegian music
Norwegian
Music
1880s in Norwegian music